Old Main is a historic three-story building on the campus of Nebraska Wesleyan University in Lincoln, Nebraska. It was built in 1887–1888, and designed in the Romanesque Revival style by Gibbs and Parker. It was the administration building on the NWU campus until 1975. It has been listed on the National Register of Historic Places since May 21, 1975.

References

National Register of Historic Places in Lincoln, Nebraska
Romanesque Revival architecture in Nebraska
School buildings completed in 1887
University and college administration buildings in the United States
Nebraska Wesleyan University